Linda B. Smith (born 1951) is a professor of Psychology and Cognitive Science at Indiana University. Smith earned her Ph.D. from the University of Pennsylvania in 1977.

Smith is the author (or co-author) of more than 100 publications on cognitive and linguistic development in young children.
With Esther Thelen, she co-authored the books A Dynamic Systems Approach to Development (Smith & Thelen 1993) and A Dynamic Systems Approach to the Development of Cognition and Action (Thelen & Smith 1994), which look at development from a dynamic systems perspective.

She is also well known for her research on the shape bias (Landau et al. 1988), children's tendency to generalize new concrete nouns on the basis of the shape of the object to which they refer.

In 1997, she received the Tracy Sonneborn Award, Indiana University's highest award to its faculty. In 2007, she was elected to the American Academy of Arts and Sciences. In 2013 she received the Rumelhart Prize from the Cognitive Science Society. In 2019, she received the Norman Anderson Lifetime Achievement Award from the Society of Experimental Psychologists. Smith is also a member of the Governing Board of the Cognitive Science Society.

Selected publications

References

External links
Indiana University Cognitive Development Laboratory: Smith's laboratory

21st-century American psychologists
American women psychologists
Women cognitive scientists
Developmental psycholinguists
Fellows of the Society of Experimental Psychologists
Fellows of the American Academy of Arts and Sciences
University of Pennsylvania alumni
Indiana University faculty
Rumelhart Prize laureates
Living people
Fellows of the Cognitive Science Society
American women academics
1951 births
21st-century American women
20th-century American psychologists